FabricLive.01 is a DJ mix compilation album by James Lavelle, as part of the FabricLive Mix Series.

Track listing

References

External links
Fabric: FabricLive.01

James Lavelle albums
2001 compilation albums